Fadeyev or Fadeev and Fadeyeva or Fadeeva (feminine) is a common Russian last name and may refer to:

 Alexander Alexandrovich Fadeyev (1901–1956), Soviet writer
 Alexander Vladimirovich Fadeyev (b. 1964), Soviet and Russian figure skater
 Alexey Fadeyev (b. 1977), Russian Nordic combined athlete
 Ivan Fadeev (1906–1976), Soviet economist and politician
 Maxim Fadeev (b. 1968), Russian musician and music producer
 Rostislav Fadeyev (1824–1883), Russian general, writer
 Oksana Fadeyeva (b. 1975), Russian table tennis player.
 Sofiya Fadeyeva (1901–1989), Soviet actress

Russian-language surnames